Congleton may refer to:

Congleton, a town in Cheshire, England
Congleton (borough) a former non-metropolitan local government district of Cheshire, England
Congleton (UK Parliament constituency) an electoral area of North West England represented in the United Kingdom's House of Commons
Congleton Town F.C., a football club
 Congleton, Lee County, Kentucky, a settlement in the United States
 Congleton, McLean County, Kentucky, a settlement in the United States
 Congleton, North Carolina, a settlement in the United States
 Congleton, Pormpuraaw Shire, a settlement in Queensland, Australia
 Congleton (surname)